A bank guarantee is a kind of guarantee from a lending organization. The bank guarantee signifies that the lending institution ensures that the liabilities of a debtor are going to be met. In other words, if the debtor fails to perform the obligation, the bank will cover it. A bank guarantee allows the customer, or debtor, to acquire goods, purchase equipment or draw down a loan. A bank guarantee is a promise from a bank or other lending institution that if a particular borrower defaults, the bank will cover the loss. A bank guarantee is similar to but not the same as a letter of credit.

References

Banking
Legal documents
Personal finance
Real estate
Securities (finance)
Interest-bearing instruments